Mind reading computers may refer to:

 Computers that can perform telepathy in science fiction
 Affective computing
 Brain–computer interfaces